Juan Pablo Arenas Núñez (born 22 April 1987) is a Chilean former professional footballer who played as a midfielder.

He played for Colo-Colo and also played (on loan) in Deportes Melipilla.

Club career
Arenas made his professional debut with Colo-Colo at the young age of seventeen against arch rival Universidad de Chile on August 1, 2004.  Arenas still has not been able to find a regular spot on the first team.

International career
With the Chile national team, Arenas has seen action at the Sub-20 level playing in the mundial Canada 2007 in Paraguay. Although he was not a regular on the Chilean starting lineup, Arenas managed to score two goals.  His first goal came against Colombia with a magnificent shot from near midfield to clinch the 5-0 Chilean victory. Subsequently, he took part in the 2007 FIFA U-20 World Cup tournament with Chile in Canada, but did not play a single minute.

Honours

Player
Colo-Colo
 Primera División de Chile (4): 2006-A, 2006-C, 2007-A, 2007-C
 Copa Sudamericana (1): Runner-up 2006

Magallanes
 Tercera División A (1): 2010

References

External links
 
 
 Juan Pablo Arenas at PlaymakerStats

1987 births
Living people
Footballers from Santiago
Association football midfielders
Chilean footballers
Chilean expatriate footballers
Chile under-20 international footballers
Colo-Colo footballers
Santiago Morning footballers
Deportes Melipilla footballers
Deportes Magallanes footballers
Provincial Osorno footballers
Trasandino footballers
Magallanes footballers
Segunda División Profesional de Chile players
Chilean Primera División players
Primera B de Chile players
Segunda División de Costa Rica players
Chilean expatriate sportspeople in Costa Rica
Expatriate footballers in Costa Rica